Walter Ward Riddington (1 October 1893 – 15 July 1954) was an Australian rules footballer who played with Melbourne in the Victorian Football League (VFL).

Notes

External links 

1893 births
1954 deaths
Australian rules footballers from Victoria (Australia)
Melbourne Football Club players